Sybra umbratica is a species of beetle in the family Cerambycidae. It was described by Pascoe in 1865.

Subspecies
 Sybra umbratica alorensis Breuning, 1956
 Sybra umbratica flavescens Breuning, 1948
 Sybra umbratica umbratica Pascoe, 1865

References

umbratica
Beetles described in 1865